Azra Hamzić (born 26 February 1992) is a Bosnian football striker currently playing in the Bosnian Championship for SFK Sarajevo, with which she has also played the Champions League. A former U-19 international, she was called up for the senior national team for the first time in the 2013 European Championship qualifying.

References

External links
 

1992 births
Living people
Bosniaks of Bosnia and Herzegovina
Bosnia and Herzegovina women's footballers
Women's association football defenders
Bosnia and Herzegovina women's international footballers